Willem Iskander (1840–1876) was an Indonesian writer, nationalist, teacher and educator. He advocated for native Indonesian education in Dutch colonial times from North Sumatra. He founded Teacher Education School (Dutch:Kweekschool Voor inlandsche onderwijzer) in 1862in Tano Bato, Mandailing Natal Regency.

Early life 
Willem Iskander (baptismal name in Arnhem, 1858) was born in Pidoli Lombang, the son of Raja Tinating. He was the 11th generation of Nasution clan. His family came from the royal house in Mandailing. He graduated from Elementary School (Dutch: Holland Inlandsche School), Panyabungan, 1853–1855. He worked in this school as teacher when he was 15, the school's youngest teacher.

Career 
He worked in Mandailing-Angkola Asisten resident office as Administrator of the government (Dutch: Adjunt Inlandsche schrifer).

In 1857, he studied in the Netherlands. He studied Vreswjik, then at Oefenschool for teaching assistant. In 1861, he returned to Indonesia and founded Kweekschool Voor Inlandche Onderwijzr in Tano Bato, Mandailing Natal Regency in 1862.

In 1874, he again visited the Netherlands to participate in the Head Teacher Education title study.

In January 1876, he married Maria Christina, but died in April of that year.

Bibliography

References

External links 
  About Willem Iskander (1840–1876) in www.basyral-hamidy-harahap.com

1840 births
1876 deaths
People from Mandailing Natal Regency
Indonesian writers
19th-century poets
19th-century Dutch East Indies people
People of Batak descent
Indonesian former Muslims
Indonesian Christians
Converts to Protestantism from Islam